A Cigarette-Maker's Romance is a 1913 British silent drama film directed by Frank Wilson and starring John Martin Harvey, Nell de Silva and Margaret Yarde. It was based on a novella by Francis Marion Crawford which had been turned into a popular stage play by Martin Harvey. A Russian Count has to live in poverty in Munich where he falls in love with a co-worker at the cigarette factory where he is employed.

Cast
 John Martin Harvey as Count Skariartine 
 Nell de Silva as Viera  
 Margaret Yarde as Woman

References

Bibliography
 Palmer, Scott. British Film Actors' Credits, 1895-1987. McFarland, 1988.

External links
 

1913 films
1913 drama films
British drama films
British silent feature films
Films directed by Frank Wilson
Films based on American novels
Films based on adaptations
British films based on plays
Films based on works by Francis Marion Crawford
British black-and-white films
1910s English-language films
1910s British films
Silent drama films